Steve White (born Stephen Gaylord Goorabian, sometimes spelled "Gailord"; November 20, 1925 – December 21, 2005) was an American jazz saxophonist based in Los Angeles who recorded in the 1950s for Nocturne, Pacific Jazz, and Atlantic. He primarily played tenor saxophone, but he also played baritone and clarinet. Steve White was friends with jazz musicians Harry Babasin and Bob Enevoldsen. White's father was a saxophonist and member of the Jimmy Dorsey Band. His father was the first to use the pseudonym "White."

Discography
 Jazz in Hollywood (Nocturne, 1954)
 Jazz Mad: The Unpredictable Steve White (Liberty)

References 

1925 births
2005 deaths
Cool jazz saxophonists
West Coast jazz saxophonists
Mainstream jazz saxophonists
Bebop saxophonists
Post-bop saxophonists
Hard bop saxophonists
American jazz tenor saxophonists
American male saxophonists
Atlantic Records artists
Musicians from Burbank, California
Musicians from Fresno, California
American people of Armenian descent
20th-century American saxophonists
Jazz musicians from California
20th-century American male musicians
American male jazz musicians